Bamukumbit (Mangkong) is a Grassfields Bantu language spoken in Cameroon.

Writing system 

The cedilla is used to represent nasal vowels: .

References

Sources
 

Nun languages
Languages of Cameroon